Miloš Vraneš (born April 25, 1995) is a Serbian professional basketball player for Spars Sarajevo that competes in ABA League Second Division and Basketball Championship of Bosnia and Herzegovina. He played college basketball for the Southeast Missouri State Redhawks. Standing at 6 ft 7 in (2.01 m), he plays at the shooting guard and small forward positions.

College career 
Miloš Vraneš signed a National Letter of Intent with Southeast Missouri State Redhawks on May 5th, 2016. He played under head coach Rick Ray and competed in Ohio Valley Conference. Southeast Missouri State Redhawks was first in the West Division and made it to the OVC Tournament both years.

Professional career 
In January 2019, Milos Vraneš began his professional career after great years in NCAA Division I College Basketball. Vraneš started his pro career in Europe, where he signed for BK Spišská Nová Ves. Vraneš competed in Slovak Basketball League and Slovak Basketball Cup. 

The following season, 2019–20, Miloš signed a deal with KK Vršac (Hemofarm) of the Basketball League of Serbia. In August 2020, Vraneš signed for Pirot and stayed in Basketball League of Serbia for one more year (season 2020-2021) where he averaged 12.6 points and 7 rebounds per game.

Season 2021-22, Miloš Vraneš signed for Mladost Mrkonjić Grad, and added another competition to his professional career, Basketball Championship of Bosnia and Herzegovina.  The second part of a season, Vraneš signed for KK Teodo Tivat, and had great season competing in Prva A Liga. 

On 1 September 2022, he signed an open contract with Slodes. 

Shortly after his signature, he accepted an offer from OKK Spars Sarajevo and agreed to compete in ABA League Second Division.

National Team career
Vraneš was a part of the Serbian national team basketball camp that was held in Denver, Colorado. He was a part of the team chosen to represent the Serbia men's national basketball team at the international basketball tournament in Dalian, China where they ended up being second after losing to Lithuania. He won the gold medal while playing for Serbia at the tournament in Weinan. Milos was a part of the Serbian men's university basketball team chosen to play at the 2017 Summer Universiade that were held in Taipei, Taiwan. Serbia was first in the group stage and ended up its competition in the semi-final after losing to the United States men's national basketball team. He was a starting shooting guard averaging 12.7 points, 6.1 rebounds and 2.4 assists per game.

References

External links 

 Milos Vranes at eurobasket.com
 Milos Vranes at espn.com
 Milos Vranes at usbasket.com
 Milos Vranes at draftexpress.com
 Milos Vranes at proballers.com
 Milos Vranes at druga.aba-liga.com
 Milos Vranes at instagram.com
 Milos Vranes at twitter.com

1995 births
Living people
Basketball players from Belgrade
Basketball League of Serbia players
Junior college men's basketball players in the United States
KK Vršac players
KK Pirot players
North Dakota State College of Science alumni
Serbian expatriate basketball people in Bosnia and Herzegovina
Serbian expatriate basketball people in Slovakia
Serbian expatriate basketball people in the United States
Serbian men's basketball players
Southeast Missouri State Redhawks men's basketball players
Forwards (basketball)